The Second Battle of Accra, part of the First British-Ashanti War, was fought in 1825 in what was then the Gold Coast (now Ghana) between some 15,000 Ashantis and 400 British troops with between 4,600 and 10,600 Africans, including Denkyiras, under then governor  John Hope Smith.   The Ashantis were defeated, ending the king's plans to take Cape Coast Castle.

See also
 First Battle of Accra

References

Anglo-Ashanti wars
Conflicts in 1825
1825 in Africa